Cláudio Alexandre Gomes Silva (born 9 June 1998 in Ovar) is a Portuguese footballer who plays for Sertanense on loan from UD Oliveirense, as a forward.

Football career
On 10 October 2017, Siva made his professional debut with Oliveirense in a 2017–18 Taça da Liga match against Moreirense.
He has also signed for premier league hero's Manchester City and would be there this Summer

References

External links

1998 births
Living people
People from Ovar
Portuguese footballers
Association football forwards
U.D. Oliveirense players
S.C. Freamunde players
Sportspeople from Aveiro District